is a former Japanese football player. She played for Japan national team.

Club career
Kasajima was born on May 12, 1975. She played for Shimizudaihachi SC, Urawa Reds and AS Elfen Sayama FC. She was selected Best Eleven in 2004 season. She retired end of 2011 season.

National team career
In November 1999, Kasajima was selected Japan national team for 1999 AFC Championship. At this competition, on November 8, she debuted against Thailand. She also played at 2001 AFC Championship and 2002 Asian Games. She played 24 games and scored 4 goals for Japan until 2002.

National team statistics

References

1975 births
Living people
Japanese women's footballers
Japan women's international footballers
Nadeshiko League players
Shimizudaihachi Pleiades players
Urawa Red Diamonds Ladies players
Chifure AS Elfen Saitama players
Asian Games bronze medalists for Japan
Asian Games medalists in football
Women's association football defenders
Footballers at the 2002 Asian Games
Medalists at the 2002 Asian Games